The Belmont Goats are a herd of goats in Portland, Oregon. Previously, the goats occupied the site of the mixed-use development known as the Goat Blocks.

References

Goats
Portland, Oregon